Basile Aka Kouamé (born 6 April 1963) is an Ivorian former professional footballer who played as a defender. He earned 45 caps with the Ivory Coast national team.

Club career
Aka Kouamé spent his entire career playing for local club ASEC Mimosas.

International career
Aka Kouamé played for Ivory Coast at the 1992 Africa Cup of Nations finals, helping the team win its first continental championship. He also played for Ivory Coast in the 1992 King Fahd Cup and 1994 and 1996 African Cup of Nations finals.

Managerial career
After his playing career ended, Aka Kouamé became a manager, leading AS Nianan and Sabé Sports de Bouna before taking the helm at ASEC Mimosas. At ASEC, he won the national league and national cup.

He would later manage Rail Club du Kadiogo, Stella Club d'Adjamé and AS Indenié Abengourou.

References

External links
 

1963 births
Living people
Association football defenders
Ivorian footballers
Ivory Coast international footballers
1992 King Fahd Cup players
1988 African Cup of Nations players
1990 African Cup of Nations players
1992 African Cup of Nations players
1994 African Cup of Nations players
1996 African Cup of Nations players
ASEC Mimosas players
Africa Cup of Nations-winning players
Ivorian football managers
Ivorian expatriate football managers